Miks Lipsbergs (born June 9, 1991) is a Latvian ice hockey forward who is currently playing for Kiruna IF (Sweden) having last played for HK Mogo of the Latvian Hockey Higher League.

Lipsberg previously played for Dinamo Riga of Kontinental Hockey League. He played for several Latvian league youth teams before joining HK Riga. His brothers Edgars Lipsbergs, Roberts Lipsbergs  and Krišs Lipsbergs also are hockey players.

On September 8, 2012 he made his debut in shoot-out win against HC Slovan Bratislava.

References

External links

1991 births
Living people
Dinamo Riga players
Jokipojat players
Latvian ice hockey forwards
LHC Les Lions players
Prizma Riga players
HK Riga players
Ice hockey people from Riga